Suad Jawad, Arabic: سعاد جواد (born 15 February 1957) is an Iraqi/Emirati dubbing artist, theatre-maker and writer. She is known as the "Queen of Dubbing" and specialises in dubbing anime.

Biography 
Jawad was born on 15 February 1957. She was awarded a BA in Fine Arts in 1979 from the University of Baghdad.  She has been outspoken about the artistry and talent needed in a good dubbing artist. In a 2016 article, she discussed how she felt that dubbing in animations had become duller over the course of her thirty-five-year career in the industry. She has also called for Arab countries to create more educational children's television programmes. She is known as the "Queen of Dubbing" for her work on children's animations. She is particularly associated with her work in anime, including appearances in: Lady Georgie as Abel; Manga Sekai Mukashi Banashi as Narrator; Rose of Versailles as Oscar.

In the 1980s Jawad was instrumental in the foundation of children's theatres in the United Arab Emirates, where she now lives, the first being Laila's Theatre, in memory of an Emirati girl who died. She has also written plays and works of fiction; her writing focuses on the experiences of women from the Gulf, especially with regard to social issues.

References

1957 births
Living people
Iraqi women writers
Iraqi writers
Voice actresses
University of Baghdad alumni
Place of birth missing (living people)